The Oklahoma Senate is composed of 48 members, each representing an electoral district in the U.S. state of Oklahoma. As of 2019, the majority of seats are held by Republicans. The current President Pro Tempore is Greg Treat of Oklahoma City.

Officers

Current senators

†Elected in a special election
§Served a term in the House, so term limited halfway into term
^Due to serving a partial term when first elected and not serving previously in the Legislature, can go beyond 12-year limit

Committees

References

External links
Oklahoma Senate

Government of Oklahoma
Oklahoma Legislature